John William Gofman (21 September 1918 – 15 August 2007) was an American scientist and advocate. He was Professor Emeritus of Molecular and Cell Biology at the University of California at Berkeley.

Gofman pioneered the field of clinical lipidology, and in 2007 was honored by the Journal of Clinical Lipidology with the title of "Father of Clinical Lipidology". With Frank T. Lindgren and other research associates, Gofman discovered and described three major classes of plasma lipoproteins, fat molecules that carry cholesterol in the blood. The team he led at the Donner Laboratory went on to demonstrate the role of lipoproteins in the causation of heart disease.

Gofman was instrumental in inducing the health-physics scientific community both to acknowledge the cancer risks of ionizing radiation and to adopt the Linear No-Threshold (LNT) model as a means of estimating actual cancer risks from low-level radiation and as the foundation of the international guidelines for radiation protection. However, his conclusions were that the dose-response relationship was not linear, but supra-linear.

Gofman's earliest research was in nuclear physics and chemistry, in close connection with the Manhattan Project. He codiscovered several radioisotopes, notably uranium-233 and its fissionability; he was the third person ever to work with plutonium and, having devised an early process for separating plutonium from fission products at J. Robert Oppenheimer's request, he was the first chemist ever to try and isolate milligram quantities of plutonium.

In 1963 Gofman established the Biomedical Research Division for the Livermore National Laboratory, where he was on the cutting edge of research into the connection between chromosomal abnormalities and cancer.

Later in life, Gofman took on a role as an advocate warning of dangers involved with nuclear power. From 1971 on, he was Chairman of the Committee for Nuclear Responsibility. He was awarded the Right Livelihood Award for "his pioneering work in exposing the health effects of low-level radiation" on the Chernobyl disaster's area population.

In his 1996 book Gofman claimed that exposure to medical x-rays was responsible for about 75 percent of breast cancers in the United States. This order of magnitude appears to correlate with the increase in breast-cancer incidence following mammography screening in the US and France.

Nuclear research
John Gofman graduated from Oberlin College with a bachelor's in chemistry in 1939, and received a doctorate in nuclear and physical chemistry from Berkeley in 1943, where he worked as a graduate student under Glenn T. Seaborg, the discoverer of plutonium and later a chairman of the US Atomic Energy Commission. In his PhD dissertation, Gofman described the discovery of radioisotopes protactinium-232, uranium-232, protactinium-233, as well as uranium-233 and the characterization of its fissionability. Seaborg had a very high opinion of Gofman : he called Gofman one of his "most brilliant students" when, in 1963, he appointed him to head the Biomedical Research Division at the Lawrence Livermore Laboratory; he wrote that his PhD dissertation was "very brilliant".

Gofman shared three patents with collaborators on their discoveries :
 n° 3,123,535 (Glenn T. Seaborg, John W. Gofman, Raymond W. Stoughton): The slow and fast neutron fissionability of uranium-233, with its application to production of nuclear power or nuclear weapons.
 n° 2,671,251 (John W. Gofman, Robert E. Connick, Arthur C. Wahl): The sodium uranyl acetate process for the separation of plutonium in irradiated fuel from uranium and fission products.
 n° 2,912,302 (Robert E. Connick, John W. Gofman, George C. Pimentel): The columbium oxide process for the separation of plutonium in irradiated fuel from uranium and fission products.

Gofman later became the group co-leader of the Plutonium Project, an offshoot of the Manhattan Project.

Medical research

Dr. Gofman earned his medical degree from the University of California, San Francisco, in 1946. After that, he and his collaborators investigated the body's lipoproteins, which contain both proteins and fats, and their circulation within the bloodstream. The researchers described low-density and high-density lipoproteins and their roles in metabolic disorders and coronary disease. This work continued throughout the late 1940s and early 1950s.

At Livermore : taking on the US Atomic Energy Commission

Establishment of LLNL's Medical Department
At the request of Ernest Lawrence, Gofman established the Medical Department at the Lawrence Livermore National Laboratory (LLNL) in early 1954 and acted as the medical director until 1957 roughly two days a week while teaching at Berkeley the rest of the time.

Establishment of LLNL's Biomedical Research Division

AEC's response to public outcry
In 1962, the US had resumed atmospheric tests of nuclear weapons at the Nevada test site in 1962. The State of Utah had set up its own network of monitoring facilities to test milk for radioiodine, since "data pertaining to the safety of the citizens of Utah was not forthcoming from the AEC", and the levels of radioactivity were found to be close to the limits prescribed by the Federal Radiation Council. The Commissioners of the AEC were "on the hot seat" and announced "a comprehensive, long-range program" to explore the effects of man-made radioactivity "upon plants, animals and human beings". At the request of the US Atomic Energy Commission and of LLNL's director John Foster, Gofman reluctantly accepted to establish the Biomedical Research Division for the LLNL in 1963. He served as the first director of the LLNL biomedical research division from 1963 to 1965 and as one of the nine associate directors of the entire lab until 1969.

Immediate moves to hinder the Biomedical Research program
The AEC had acted too fast in response to public outcry : one of the five Commissioners, James T. Ramey, had not been consulted before announcing the establishment of the Biomedical Research Division. Gofman reported that "Apparently it would have been too embarrassing, with the extensive AEC publicity about the program, to cancel it outright. Instead, the budget was cut even from the low starting value and we were given to understand, in no uncertain terms, that the program was not going to be supported at the level required to do the tasks outlined originally." However, Gofman and colleagues "accepted the reduced program, knowing that [they] could certainly still do much of the important work on radiation hazards."

After the atmospheric test ban treaty was signed in June 1963 and the public pressure on AEC was released, "[t]he Joint Committee on Atomic Energy struck from the AEC budget the funds that were to be used to construct a Bio-Medical complex at Livermore. This was tantamount to the JCAE stating that the Livermore Bio-Medical Program was unnecessary, for without facilities to work in it was hard to envision much of a program being possible." LLNL's director John Foster and Gofman had to struggle to obtain the initially promised funds.

The Knapp report on radioiodine from fallout in milk

In 1959, the geneticist Edward B. Lewis computed that children exposed to fallout from nuclear tests may have received very high doses of radioactivity from iodine-131 in cow milk. His estimates prompted the Joint Committee on Atomic Energy to request that the AEC produce a report on the risks of short-lived isotopes. In 1960, Harold A. Knapp, a mathematician working within the AEC Division of Biology and Medicine's Fallout Studies Branch, authored this report, but since it was finished during an international moratorium on atmospheric nuclear tests, it had no notable impact. Then, in 1962, while the USSR and the USA had resumed nuclear tests and the Limited Test Ban Treaty was being prepared in response to huge international pressure, Knapp took on the task of estimating the radioiodine exposure of Americans before 1958, at a time when milk was not monitored. Knapp conclusions were alarming, and blatantly departed from preceding AEC's reassurances that the public had never been exposed to harmful levels of radioactivity. He "showed that, from just one 1953 test, infants who had been living in a radiation hotspot around St. George, Utah, might well have received I-131 doses anywhere from 150 to 750 times existing annual permissible doses."

Beginning in fall 1962, the AEC resorted to diverse pretexts to block the publication of Knapp's findings. In spring 1963, Gofman, was solicited to participate in a so-called "Ad Hoc Working Group on Radioiodine and the Environment" assembled by AEC's Division of Operational Safety's director, Gordon Dunning. Gofman reported that "In essence, the message to [this] Committee […] was « How can we stop this report - a report which will, in effect, make the AEC reports over the past 10 years look untrue? »". In spite of AEC's Headquarters' objections, the committee recommended publication of Knapp's report, which was finally published by the AEC in June 1963, followed by a summary in Nature.

Gofman and Tamplin

In 1964, Gofman raised questions about a lack of data on low-level radiation and also proposed a wide-ranging study of exposure in medicine and the workplace at a symposium for nuclear scientists and engineers. This helped start a national inquiry into the safety of atomic power. With his colleague Dr. Arthur R. Tamplin, Dr. Gofman then looked at health studies of the survivors of Hiroshima and Nagasaki, as well as other epidemiological studies, and conducted research on radiation's influences on human chromosomes. The two scientists suggested that federal safety guidelines for low-level exposures be reduced by 90 percent in 1969. The Atomic Energy Commission contested the findings, and "the furor made Dr. Gofman a reluctant figurehead of the anti-nuclear movement" according to The New York Times.  In 1970, he testified in favor of a bill to ban commercial nuclear reactors in New York City and told the City Council that a reactor in an urban environment would be "equal in the opposite direction to all the medical advances put together in the last 25 years."

Gofman's major contribution to radiation-safety science

Gofman and Tamplin were instrumental in inducing the health physics scientific community both to acknowledge the somatic (i.e. leukemia and cancer) risks of ionizing radiation, at a time when only the genetic risks were considered of significant concern, and to adopt the so-called Linear No-Threshold (LNT) model "as a means of numerically estimating actual cancer risks from low-level radiation", which "was a watershed event in radiation-safety science and politics". The LNT model has since become the foundation of the international guidelines for radiation protection.

Indeed, it was Gofman and Tamplin's argumented opposition to the Federal Radiation Council (FRC) radiation-safety guidelines who prompted the National Academy of Sciences (NAS), on the recommendation made in December 1969 by Victor Bond, "a prominent health physicist and chairman of the NAS-NRC Subcommittee on Radiobiology of the Committee on Nuclear Science", to gather its first BEIR (Biological Effects of Ionizing Radiation) committee. According to an internal memo cited by Semendeferi, the BEIR I committee was to "thoroughly digest and carefully analyze various pertinent controversial models (Gofman and Tamplin)".

After two years of study, the BEIR I committee published its famous BEIR I report in November 1972. Although departing from Gofman and Tamplin's work on significant aspects, it nevertheless vindicated their arguments to a large extent. Semendeferi notes that "[t]he report's long bibliography cited almost all of Gofman and Tamplin's work. Echoing Gofman and Tamplin, the BEIR I Committee emphasized that the cancer effects of low-level radiation were of much greater concern than leukemia or genetic effects. The current radiation limit was "based on genetic considerations," and the committee concluded that the FRC limit was therefore "unnecessarily high" and could safely be much lower."

Semendeferi reports that, according to the radiobiologist and environmental health specialist Edward Radford, who was a member of the BEIR I committee and the chairman of the BEIR III committee, "Gofman deserved credit for raising the issue of the somatic ris's of low-level radiation as early as he did", but "never received the recognition he deserved for his contributions to radiation-safety science" because he was "stigmatized as an extreme antinuclear scientist".

Opposition to nuclear power 

Gofman retired as a teaching professor in 1973 and became a professor emeritus of molecular and cell biology.

Gofman testified on the behalf of Samuel Lovejoy at Lovejoy's 1974 trial. Lovejoy was charged with malicious destruction of property for toppling a weather tower in Montague, Massachusetts, owned by Northeast Utilities. Lovejoy's actions were an act of protest against a proposed nuclear power plant, Montague Nuclear Power Plant, to be built on Montague Plains. Lovejoy was inspired by Gofman's book, Poisoned Power.

Gofman used his low-level radiation health model to predict 333 excess cancer or leukemia deaths from the 1979 Three Mile Island accident. Studies of the health effects of the Three Mile Island accident have so far (by 2013) not observed any excess mortality. A retrospective study of Pennsylvania Cancer Registry found an increased incidence of thyroid cancer in counties south of TMI and in high-risk age groups. The Talbott lab at the University of Pittsburgh reported finding only a few, small, mostly statistically non-significant, increased cancer risks within the TMI population. However, excess leukemia among males was observed. The ongoing TMI epidemiological research has been accompanied by a discussion of epidemiological methodology, such as problems in dose and illness classifications.

Three months after the Chernobyl disaster, Gofman predicted that Chernobyl would cause "475,000 fatal cancers plus about 
an equal number of additional non-fatal cases, occurring over time both inside and outside the ex-Soviet Union". In contrast, even some 19 years later in September 2005, an official UN IAEA report claimed 4,000 deaths as the final estimated toll from Chernobyl.  In their 2006 book Alexey V. Yablokov and other Russian and East European researchers estimated that Chernobyl caused a million deaths through 2004, nearly 170,000 of them in North America.  The book's English translation Chernobyl: Consequences of the Catastrophe for People and the Environment was published by the New York Academy of Sciences in 2009. The book cites "5,000 mainly Slavic-language scientific papers the IAEA overlooked", notwithstanding the fact that 13 of the authors of the Chernobyl Forum were from Ukraine, Russia or Belarus. M. I. Balonov criticized the methodology of the book. M. I. Balonov criticized the methodology of the book's estimation of Chernobyl's excess deaths and radiation-induced health effects and claimed the numbers were exaggerations which "could lead quite unnecessarily to a panic reaction". Rosalie Bertell has asserted the above estimates of Gofman (1986) and Yablokov (2006) are too conservative.

After a speech Gofman gave on nuclear waste at a national conference of activists in the summer of 1990, Charles Butler approached him for help. Butler was a retired physicist living in the Mojave Desert town of Needles, California, and was looking for help to stop the proposed low-level nuclear waste facility at Ward Valley. Gofman referred him to the Abalone Alliance Clearinghouse in San Francisco. With less than two weeks before the closure of the Environmental Impact Statement, the Alliance was able to mount a letter writing campaign that helped delay the EIS for an additional 90 days. This initial delay gave activists the time to form Don't Waste California and build a grassroots campaign that eventually stopped Ward Valley from opening.

Gofman also did work on the Diablo Canyon Power Plant.

Support to nuclear deterrence
Gofman considered that "nuclear deterrence is important", for he did not believe that comprehensive test bans were enforceable; thus he favored underground atomic bomb tests while acknowledging that "They are harmful, a little will leak out. A small number of people will get hurt." He claimed "I don't understand the disarmament movement". More precisely, he was of the opinion that if the US were to disarm unilaterally, "the Soviet leaders may well try to make [the US] a slave state. […] There will surely never be a solution to human problems by any coercion or force. But there will also never be a solution through unarmed freedom as long as powerful bullies exist who will use force."

Birth and death

Gofman was born in Cleveland, Ohio to Jewish parents, David and Sarah Gofman, who immigrated to the US from czarist Russia in about 1905. His father had been "involved in some of the early revolutionary activities against the Czar." Gofman died of heart failure at age 88 on August 15, 2007, in his home in San Francisco.

Bibliography

 Dietary Prevention and Treatment of Heart Disease, (with E. Virginia Dobbin and Alex V. Nichols), 256 pages, 1958, Putnam
 What we do know about heart attacks, 180 pages, 1958, Putnam
 Coronary heart disease, 363 pages, 1959, Charles C. Thomas
 Population control through nuclear pollution,(with Arthur R. Tamplin, Ph.D.) 242 pages, 1970, Nelson Hall Co.
 Poisoned Power, The Case Against Nuclear Power Plants Before and After Three Mile Island (with Arthur R. Tamplin, Ph.D.), 1971, 1979
 Irrevy: an irreverent, illustrated view of nuclear power, 1979, Committee for Nuclear Responsibility, 
 Radiation And Human Health, 908 pages, 1981
 X-Rays: Health Effects of Common Exams (with Egan O'Connor), 439 pages, 1985
 Radiation-Induced Cancer From Low-Dose Exposure: An Independent Analysis 480 pages, 1990
 Chernobyl Accident: Radiation Consequences for This and Future Generations, 574 pages, 1994
 Preventing Breast Cancer: The Story of a Major, Proven, Preventable Cause of this Disease 1996
 Radiation from Medical Procedures in the Pathogenesis of Cancer and Ischemic Heart Disease: Dose-Response Studies with Physicians per 100,000 Population 1999

Awards

 Gold-Headed Cane Award, University of California Medical School, 1946, presented to the graduating senior who most fully personifies the qualities of a "true physician."
 Modern Medicine Award, 1954, for outstanding contributions to heart disease research.
 The Lyman Duff Lectureship Award of the American Heart Association in 1965, for research in atherosclerosis and coronary heart disease; lecture published in 1966 as "Ischemic Heart Disease, Atherosclerosis, and Longevity," in Circulation 34: 679–697.
 The Stouffer Prize (shared) 1972, for outstanding contributions to research in arteriosclerosis.
 American College of Cardiology, 1974; selection as one of twenty-five leading researchers in cardiology of the past quarter-century.
 University of California, Berkeley, Bancroft Library, 1988; announcement of the "Gofman Papers" established in the History of Science and Technology Special Collection (October 1988, Bancroftiana, No. 97: 10–11). 
 Right Livelihood Award, 1992
 Honored Speaker for the Meeting of the Arteriosclerosis Section of the American Heart Association, 1993

See also
Linus Pauling
Alice Stewart
Ernest Sternglass
Linear no-threshold model
Edward B. Lewis

References

External links
"Who was John Gofman", Lipid Luminations, radio interview with W. Virgil Brown, editor-in-chief of the Journal of Clinical Lipidology
Obituary in The Times
John Gofman, anti-nuclear activist & lipid researcher, has died, Berkeley Obituary
Curriculum Vitae
Committee for Nuclear Responsibility
John Gofman's online papers and books
US DOE Office of Human Radiation Experiments, Oral history of Dr. John W. Gofman 
California Monthly: A Conversation with Dr. John Gofman, 1993
Right Livelihood Award citation
Los Angeles Times obituary
San Francisco Chronicle obituary
John Gofman's Nuclear Courage
Gofman on the health effects of radiation

1918 births
2007 deaths
Scientists from Cleveland
American people of Russian-Jewish descent
20th-century American chemists
American molecular biologists
Nuclear chemists
Discoverers of chemical elements
American medical researchers
Radiation health effects researchers
American anti–nuclear power activists
Jewish American scientists
Manhattan Project people
Oberlin College alumni
Activists from Ohio
20th-century American Jews
21st-century American Jews
University of California, Berkeley faculty